The following people are Scottish recipients of the Victoria Cross.

A
Robert Bellew Adams – 1897; Nawa Kili, India
Frederick Robertson Aikman – 1858; Amethi, India
Robert Hope Moncrieff Aitken – 1857; Lucknow, India
William Anderson – 1915; Neuve Chapelle, France
William Herbert Anderson – 1918; Bois Favieres, France
William Angus – 1915; Givenchy, France
Adam Archibald – 1918; Ors, France

B
William Babtie – 1899; Battle of Colenso, South Africa
Thomas Beach – 1854; Battle of Inkerman, Crimea
William Davidson Bissett – 1918; Maing, France
James Blair – 1857; Neemuch, India
Robert Blair – 1857; Bolandshahr, India
Frank Gerald Blaker – 1944; Taunghi, Burma (now Myanmar)
William Anderson Bloomfield – 1916; Miali, Tanganyika (now Tanzania)
Andrew Cathcart Bogle – 1857; Oonao, India
Stanley Henry Parry Boughey – 1917; El Burf, Palestine
Walter Lorrain Brodie – 1914; Becelaere, Belgium
James Anson Otho Brooke – 1914; Gheluvelt, Belgium
William Arthur McCrae Bruce – 1914; Givenchy, France
John Crawford Buchan – 1918; Marteville, France

C
Thomas Cadell – 1857; Delhi, India
Thomas Caldwell – 1918; Oudenaarde, Belgium
Aylmer Spicer Cameron – 1858; Kotah, India
John Charles Campbell – 1941; Sidi Rezegh, Libya
John Vaughan Campbell – 1916; Ginchy, France
Kenneth Campbell – 1941; Brest, France
Lorne MacLaine Campbell – 1943; Wadi Akarit, Tunisia
John Carmichael – 1917; Zwarteleen, Belgium
John Alexander Christie – 1917; Fejja, Palestine
William Clamp – 1917; Poelkapelle, Belgium
Hugh Stewart Cochrane – 1858; Jhansi, India
John Cook – 1878; Peiwar Kotal, Afghanistan
James Craig – 1855; Sebastopol, Crimea
John Manson Craig – 1917; Egypt
John Alexander Cruickshank – 1944; Atlantic
Arthur Cumming – 1942; Kuantan, Malaya
William James Montgomery Cuninghame – 1854; Sebastopol, Crimea

D
James Davis – 1858; Fort Ruhya, India
James Lennox Dawson – 1915; Hohenzollern Redoubt, France
John Brunton Daykins – 1918; Solesmes, France
William Henry Dick-Cunyngham – 1879; Sherpur Pass, Afghanistan
Robert James Thomas Digby-Jones – 1900; Ladysmith, South Africa
Angus Falconer Douglas-Hamilton – 1915; Hill 70, France
Robert Downie – 1916; Lesboeufs, France
James Dundas – 1865; Dewan-Giri, India
Robert Dunsire – 1915; Hill 70, France

E
Alexander Edwards – 1917; Ypres, Belgium
John MacLaren Erskine – 1916; Givenchy, France
Samuel Evans – 1855; Sebastopol, Crimea

F
Donald Dickson Farmer – 1900; Nooitgedacht, South Africa
Francis Edward Henry Farquharson – 1858; Lucknow, India
Viscount, Alexander Edward Murray Fincastle – 1897; Nawa Kili, India
George Findlater – 1897; Dargai Heights, India
George de Cardonnel Elmsall Findlay – 1918; Catillon, France
David Finlay – 1915; Rue du Bois, France
Samuel Frickleton – 1917; Messines, Belgium (in NZEF)

G
William Gardner – 1858; Bareilly, India
William Eagleson Gordon – 1900; Krugersdorp, South Africa
John Reginald Noble Graham – 1917; Battle of Istabulat, Mesopotamia
Charles James William Grant – 1891; Thobal, Burma (now Myanmar)
John Grieve – 1854; Balaclava, Crimea

H
John Brown Hamilton – 1917; Ypres-Menin Road, Belgium
Thomas de Courcy Hamilton – 1855; Sebastopol, Crimea
John Hannah – 1940; Antwerp, Belgium
Arthur Henderson – 1917; Fontaine-les-Croiselles, France
George Stuart Henderson – 1920; Hillah, Mesopotamia
Herbert Stephen Henderson – 1896; Bulawayo, Rhodesia (now Zimbabwe)
Anthony Dickson Home – 1857; Lucknow, India
William Hope – 1855; Sebastopol, Crimea
James Palmer Huffam – 1918; St. Servin's Farm, France
David Ferguson Hunter – 1918; Moeuvres, France
Thomas Peck Hunter – 1945; Lake Comacchio, Italy

I
James John McLeod Innes – 1858; Sultanpore, India

J
Charles Alfred Jarvis – 1914; Jemappes, Belgium
William Henry Johnston – 1914; Missy, France

K
Charles Thomas Kennedy – 1900; Dewetsdorp, South Africa
Allan Ebenezer Ker – 1918; St. Quentin, France
William Alexander Kerr – 1857; Kolapore, India
Geoffrey Charles Tasker Keyes – 1941; Beda Littoria, Libya
John Simpson Knox – 1854; Battle of the Alma, Crimea

L
Daniel Laidlaw – 1915; Loos, France
David Ross Lauder – 1915; Gallipoli, Tunisia
Peter Leitch – 1855; Sebastopol, Crimea
James Leith – 1858; Betwa, India
Robert James Lindsay – 1854; Battle of the Alma, Crimea
Frederick Luke – 1914; Le Cateau, France
Charles Lumley – 1855, Sebastopol, Crimea
Charles Antony, The Lord, Lyell – 1943; Dj Bou Arada, Tunisia

M
Henry MacDonald – 1855; Sebastopol, Crimea
David Lowe MacIntyre – 1918; Henin, France
Donald MacIntyre – 1872; Lalgnoora, India
David MacKay – 1857; Lucknow, India
John Frederick MacKay – 1900; Johannesburg, South Africa
James MacKenzie – 1914; Rouges Bancs, France
John Mackenzie – 1900; Dompoassi, Ashanti (now Ghana)
Donald MacKintosh – 1917; Fampoux, France
Hector Lachlan Stewart MacLean – 1897; Nawa Kili, India
Herbert Taylor Macpherson – 1857; Lucknow, India
Hugh Gordon Malcolm – 1942; Chougui, Tunisia
John Grant Malcolmson – 1857; Battle of Khoosh-ab, Persia
Henry May – 1914; La Boutillerie, France
John McAulay – 1917; Fontaine Notre Dame, France
William McBean – 1858; Lucknow, India
Robert McBeath – 1917; Cambrai, France
John McDermond – 1854; Battle of Inkerman, Crimea
John McDougall – 1860; Taku Forts, China
Samuel McGaw – 1874; Battle of Amoaful, Ashanti (now Ghana)
David Stuart McGregor – 1918; Hoogemolen, Belgium
Roderick McGregor – 1855; Sebastopol, Crimea
Louis McGuffie – 1918; Wytschaete, Belgium
Hugh McInnes – 1857; Lucknow, India
George Imlach McIntosh – 1917; Ypres, Belgium
Hugh McIver – 1918; Courcelle-le Compte, France
James McKechnie – 1854; Battle of the Alma, Crimea
John Carstairs McNeill – 1864; Ohaupu, New Zealand
Stewart McPherson – 1857; Lucknow, India
James McPhie – 1918; Aubencheul-au-Bac, France
John Meikle – 1918; Marfaux, France
Charles Melvin – 1917; Battle of Istabulat, Mesopotamia
Anthony Cecil Capel Miers – 1942; Corfu Harbour, Greece
Duncan Millar (or Miller) – 1859; Maylah Ghat, India
James Miller – 1857; Futtehpore, India
James Munro (VC) – 1857; Lucknow, India

O
John O'Neill (or O'Niell) – 1918; Moorseele, Belgium

P
James Park – 1857; Lucknow, India
George Henry Tatham Paton – 1917; Gonnelieu, France
John Paton – 1857; Lucknow, India
John Perie – 1855; Sebastopol, Crimea
James Dalgleish Pollock – 1915; Hohenzollern Redoubt, France
Patrick Anthony Porteous – 1942; Dieppe, France

R
Henry Ramage – 1854; Balaclava, Crimea
Harry Sherwood Ranken – 1914; Haute-Avesnes, France
William Reid – 1943; Düsseldorf, Germany
William Rennie – 1857; Lucknow, India
William Reynolds (VC) – 1854; Battle of the Alma, Crimea
James Cleland Richardson – 1916; Battle of the Ancre Heights, France
John Ripley – 1915; Rue du Bois, France
Henry Peel Ritchie – 1914; Dar es Salaam, Tanganyika (now Tanzania)
Walter Potter Ritchie – 1916; Beaumont Hamel, France
William Robertson – 1899; Battle of Elandslaagte, South Africa
George Rodgers – 1858; Marar, India
John Ross (VC) – 1855; Sebastopol, Crimea
(Robert Reilly) Glasgow. 1916 Belgium

S
George McKenzie Samson – 1915; Gallipoli, Turkey
George Sellar – 1879; Asmai Heights, Afghanistan
Same (John) Shaw – 1858; Lucknow, India
John Simpson (VC) – 1858; Fort Ruhya, India
John Kendrick Skinner – 1917; Wijdendrift, Belgium
Archibald Bisset Smith – 1917; Atlantic
David Spence – 1858; Shunsabad, India
Edward Spence – 1858; Fort Ruhya, India
William George Drummond Stewart – 1857; Lucknow, India
James Stokes – 1945; Kervenheim, Germany

T
James Edward Tait – 1918; Amiens, France
Alexander Thompson – 1858; Fort Ruhya, India
George Thompson – 1945; Dortmund-Ems Canal, Germany
Ross Tollerton – 1914; Battle of the Aisne, France
James Youll Turnbull – 1916; Authuille, France

V
William John Vousden – 1879; Asmai Heights, Afghanistan

W
Samuel Thomas Dickson Wallace – 1917; Gonnelieu, France
Joseph Watt – 1917; Straits of Otranto, Italy
George Wilson – 1914; Verneuill, France
John Augustus Wood – 1856; Bushire, Persia

Y
William Young – 1915; Fonquevillers, France
David Reginald Younger – 1900; Krugersdorp, South Africa

See also+ Peter Watt

Scotland
Victoria Cross, Scottish
 
 Victoria Cross recipients